Jitu Goswami   is an Indian politician member of Bharatiya Janata Party from Assam. He is an MLA, elected from the Barhampur constituency in the 2021 Assam Legislative Assembly election .

References 

Bharatiya Janata Party politicians from Assam
Living people
People from Nagaon district
Assam MLAs 2021–2026
Year of birth missing (living people)